Navan Gaels GAA  or An Uaimh Gaels was a Gaelic Athletic Association club located in the town of Navan in County Meath, Ireland. The club mainly focused on playing football in Meath competitions. The club was a powerful side in the Meath Senior Football Championship in the 1920s and 1930s. The team won 10 senior championships, their first in 1907 and their last in 1938. The team dissolved shortly after this and were informally succeeded by Navan O'Mahonys GAA. The team is now defunct.

Honours

Meath Senior Football Championship: 10
1907, 1924, 1925, 1926, 1929, 1930, 1933, 1934, 1935, 1938

Notable players
 Tommy McGuinness

External links

Gaelic games clubs in County Meath